Inlet Beach is located in south Walton and Bay Counties in Florida, with the western most side being Bay County at the state park. Inlet Beach is the most eastern South Walton County beach and is named after Phillips Inlet.

The use of the name Inlet Beach antedates World War II.

Much of the land was distributed through a lottery system to World War II veterans, and was sometimes known as "Soldiers Beach" or "Veterans Beach".

References

Beaches of Walton County, Florida
Populated coastal places in Florida on the Gulf of Mexico
Beaches of Florida